Werner Hamel (9 February 1911 – 25 July 1987) was a German field hockey player who competed in the 1936 Summer Olympics.

He was a member of the German field hockey team, which won the silver medal. He played two matches as forward.

External links
 
profile

1911 births
1987 deaths
German male field hockey players
Olympic field hockey players of Germany
Field hockey players at the 1936 Summer Olympics
Olympic silver medalists for Germany
Olympic medalists in field hockey
Medalists at the 1936 Summer Olympics
20th-century German people